Felicia Rabourn (born December 22, 1990) is an American politician serving in the Kentucky House of Representatives from the 47th district.

Early life
Felicia Rabourn was born on December 22, 1990 in Henry County, Kentucky. She spent her early career working for Edward Jones Investments as a branch office administrator.

Political career
Eventually, Rabourn became the youth chair of the Henry County Republican Party.

2020 primary
Rabourn won a close primary in 2020, winning by just 2.2 percent.

2020 election
Rabourn won the 2020 election, 69.4 percent to 30.6 percent. She won Carroll County with 68.2 percent of the vote, Gallatin County with 74.9 percent of the vote, Henry County with 71.6 percent of the vote, and Trimble County with 61.5 percent of the vote.

Political Positions
Rabourn is described as a “Young Conservative Republican”. Rabourn has been criticized for supporting plans that would take healthcare away from many people in Kentucky.

References

1990 births
Living people
21st-century American politicians
Republican Party members of the Kentucky House of Representatives